is a Japanese monthly magazine which focuses on bishōjo characters from anime and Japanese computer and console games, edited by IID and published by Gakken Plus. It is known for having many posters, pinups and large pictures among the articles.

Overview 
Megami Magazine was originally released as an extra edition of the anime magazine "Animedia" by Gakken Kenkyusha (later Gakken Holdings). As the anime magazine  was discontinued, publication began on July 28, 1999 for an independent Megami Magazine to fill the void with a focus on "gal games". Megami Magazine was originally released every odd month on the 28th before it was changed to every even month starting with the February 28, 2000 issue. This did not last long as the magazine was finally switched from a bi-monthly to a monthly basis release starting in November, 2000. During this time the focus of the magazine was shifted from "gal games" to "anime" due to a surge in popularity with "moe" type characters. An after effect from the monthly switch led to the split off of “Megami Magazine Special” from the main issue of “Animedia” starting in March 2003.

The Gakken Group was reorganized in October 2009 which caused Megami Magazine to briefly come under the umbrella of Gakken Publishing. This was further modified with the merging of Gakken Publishing with Gakken Marketing and others which led to Gakken Plus taking its place. Megami Magazine was converted into e-book format in April 2018 following the digital conversion of "Animedia" and "Voice Actor Animedia". On February 1, 2020 the editing and publishing business was transferred from Gakken Plus to IID along with "Animedia". The former of these two companies still officially releases the magazine under their name Gakken Plus.

Features

Adult content
Until the April 2005 issue, there was a section introducing adult anime, which included scenes of female characters with their nipples exposed. Some works even had posters attached, however that section has been discontinued.

Centerfolds and posters
Megami Magazine is unique because each issue is supplemented by more than 20 posters.

Girls Avenue
"Girls Avenue" was a section in Megami Magazine where an artist was featured and one of his or her illustrations was included as a pinup poster. As of Megami Magazine volume 150, the "Girls Avenue" section has been discontinued and is now released as a series of art books.

Mascot Character 
Claire Froebel (Voice actor: Reiko Takagi / character design: Masa Shiranagi. The name was decided on by public readers) who is the navigator of the reader's corner "MegaTen!" had appeared in the magazine's TV commercials aired in Magical Girl Lyrical Nanoha A's and became a de facto mascot character of the magazine.

Series

Sister magazines & special editions 
Along with the main Megami Magazine line, Gakken also publishes several other titles using the same name or content.

Radio 
In commemoration of the 100th issue of the magazine in September 2008, the internet radio program “HAMIDASE! Megami Magazine RADIO!!” was broadcast in August the same year. From October 2009, regular broadcasting started on Radio Kansai and Nippon Cultural Broadcasting's digital radio "Cho! A & G +". The program was remastered to "Hamiraji!!" since April 2012, but it ended on October 4, 2015.

Reception 
On the introduction page of the program for anime broadcast, there was an error saying that  “Suite PreCure ♪” was broadcast on Sundays at 3:30 PM on the “Miyazaki Broadcasting Channel.” Somehow the error was there, even though “Suite PreCure ♪” was not released yet, when the broadcast schedule was published. In addition, there was a similar mistake in the previous program about the anime “Heart Catch PreCure!”. In addition, “Miyazaki Broadcasting” broadcast works from the same time slots 16 days later  (The delay was half a year, until mid-July 2012. However, the delays were shortened because two episodes were broadcast together until mid-November 2012. Then it was discontinued in March 2018.on Tuesday at 3:30 PM. It seems to have been a typographical error in the description of this time slot, but no one understands how the mistake went undiscovered for so long.

See also

 Anime magazine
 Animedia
 Voice actor Animedia -The composition of the magazine is based on this magazine.
 Daughter TYPE
 Moe
 Girl love

Notes

References

External links
 Official site 
 Megami Magazine Editorial Department (@MegamiMAGAZINE) --Twitter

Monthly manga magazines published in Japan
Video game magazines published in Japan
Magazines established in 1999
1999 establishments in Japan
Magazines published in Tokyo